KGVY (1080 AM) is a commercial radio station located in Green Valley, Arizona, broadcasting to the Green Valley, Sahuarita, Tucson, Arizona area on 101.5 MHz on translator K268DC. KGVY airs an oldies music format branded as KGVY 1080 AM and 101.5 FM. KGVY provides news, weather, community events, and local business news to Green Valley, Sahuarita, and the Santa Cruz Valley.

KGVY's website www.kgvy1080.com provides in depth community information and streams 24 hours a day and includes community produced videos. KGVY sponsors multiple business events throughout the year including the Home and Living Show and Senior Information Fair.  KGVY also publishes "The KGVY Quarterly" and "The White Elephant" guide as the official paper for the White Elephant Community Foundation.

KGVY airs syndicated programming "Goddard's Gold" from United Stations Radio Networks and "Beatle Brunch" from Westwood One.

External links

 
 

GVY
Radio stations established in 1981
GVY